Liru (also Romanized as Līrū and Lirow) is a village in Nilkuh Rural District in the Central District of Galikash County, Golestan Province, Iran. At the 2006 census, its population was 461, in 110 families.

References 

Populated places in Galikash County